Pitcairnia aphelandriflora is a species of flowering plant in the family Bromeliaceae, native to Panama, Ecuador and Peru. It was first described by Charles Antoine Lemaire in 1869.

References

aphelandriflora
Flora of Ecuador
Flora of Panama
Flora of Peru
Plants described in 1869